Arstarulsmirus Arsujumfus Tarus(born as Gustavs Butelis, June 19, 1978) better known by his stage name Gustavo is a Latvian rapper and producer. He's released 4 albums, latest one being Pilsētas portāls, and received multiple awards for his songs and albums.

Biography 
Butelis was interested in music from young age, when he wanted to play drums or guitar, but his father convinced him to partake saxophone play. He was interested in many music genres, at one point especially metal music, but Butelis interest in hip-hop started at age of 15. He began work on his musical career in 1995 at age of 18, when with his friends he started a band Fact. Butelis was lead musician in the band and took music work very seriously. His solo career as Gustavo began after Fact fully disbanded.

In 2002, after more than 2 year silence, he released his first single Jau-tā-jums, but his debut album Beidzot was only released in 2004. Gustavo's second solo album Pa pāris pantiem/viesības viesnīcā was released in 2006. Gustavo also produced 2008 album Tur kaut kam ir jābūt by Latvian band Brainstorm. Gustavo released 3 singles from his next album 3. elpa - Plus/mīnuss, Par citu meiteni, Mūsu soļi. All three singles were publicly well-received, becoming top hits in many Latvian radio stations. Song Mūsu soļi also became basketball club's Rīgas VEF official anthem. On December 10, 2009, in club "Essential" was the album presentation. The album was released on June 16, 2010. After release of his last album, he turned to Iisiidiology and changed his official name to Arstarulsmirus Arsujumfus Tarus and started doing educational lectures about life.

Discography

Albums 
 Beidzot! (2004)
 Pa pāris pantiem/Viesības viesnīcā (2006)
 3. elpa (2010)
 Pilsētas portāls (2011)

Singles 

 Jau-tā-jums (2002)

Videography 

 Jau-tā-jums (ft. Žaks)
 E.V.I.T.A. (ft. Čižiks)
 Taisnā tiesa (ft. Čižiks)
 No lūpām lasi (ft. Vlady no Kasta)
 Mūsu soļi
 Paldies, ka esat!

As a feature 

 Ozols - Bokss (ft. Gustavo and Astra)
 Prāta Vētra - Tur kaut kam ir jābūt (ft. Gustavo)
 Pikaso - Esi brīvs (ft. Gustavo and R-viss)
 Camillas - Mainīt pasauli (ft. Gustavo)

Annual Latvian Music Recording Awards

Received awards 

 2004: "Šāda veida ainas" (best hip hop song)
 2004: "Beidzot!" (best hip hop album)
 2006: "No lūpām lasi" (together with Vlady) (best dance music, hip hop or R’n’B song)
 2006: "Pa pāris pantiem/Viesības viesnīcā” (best dance music, hip hop or R’n’B album)
 2007: "Esi brīvs" (together with Pikaso (rapper) and R-viss) (best music video clip)
 2010: "Trešā elpa" (best hip hop album)
 2010: "Mūsu soļi" (best music video clip)

Nominations 

 2003: "Zaudētās tiesības" (together with Mirdza Zīvere) (best hip hop song)
 2007: "No lūpām lasi" (together with Vlady) (best music video clip)
 2010: "Mainīt pasauli" (together with Camillas) (best music video clip)
 2010: "Kur ir mana galodiņa" (together with Čižiks) (best song)

References 

1978 births
Living people
Musicians from Riga
Latvian rappers
Latvian songwriters
Latvian hip hop musicians